Tatyana Vladimirovna Kosmacheva (born 13 March 1985) is a Russian theater and film actress.

Biography
Tatyana Kosmacheva born March 13, 1985, in Reutov. She is a well-known actress. Kosmacheva can play piano. Kosmacheva loved theater from a young age. She took some acting lessons and then she found a job in theater. After that, she auditioned to take a lead role in the mystery-thriller TV series Zakrytaya shkola (English: Closed school), finally she took the part.

Filmography

External links
 
 Tatyana Kosmacheva on KinoPoisk.ru
 Tatyana Kosmacheva on KinoMania.ru
 Tatyana Kosmacheva on 7days.ru
 Tatyana Kosmacheva on BestActor.ru
 Tatyana Kosmacheva on Twitter

1985 births
People from Reutov
Living people
Russian film actresses
Russian television actresses
Russian stage actresses
Actresses from Moscow